Omelete is a Brazilian entertainment website created in 2000 by Érico Borgo, Marcelo Forlani and Marcelo Hessel that covers some subjects of pop culture such as movies, comics, music, television and video games.

History
In June 2000, Érico Borgo, Marcelo Forlani and Marcelo Hessel created Omelete. The content of website was initially dedicated to the fans of comics, but the site grew up and in 2007 had an estimate of 120 000 visits per day. In 2007, is release a press magazine and the OmeleTV, initially named Omeletevê, which consists of a videocast with interviews and news recorded by the editors of the site. The first video was an interview with comedian Jerry Seinfeld.

Two years later, Omelete release Almanaque do Cinema, a cine almanac that was published by Ediouro and written by Marcelo Forlani, Marcelo Hessel and Érico Borgo.

Comic Con Experience

Omelete team, alongside others (e.g. Disney (Marvel, Lucasfilm, Pixar), Paramount, Fox, Warner Bros.) were responsible to bring to Brazilian shores the full experience of a Comic Con such as San Diego and New York. They successfully brought people connected to those studios, as well, known actors, like Jason Momoa, Sean Astin and Richard Armitage.

References

External links
 Website

Brazilian news websites
Internet properties established in 2000
2000 establishments in Brazil